There are approximately 265 species of non-marine molluscs living in the wild in Poland.

Systematic list
The list is in zoological order rather than alphabetical order. The Polish common name (where one exists) of each mollusc is given first, in parentheses, and then the scientific name.

The source for the non-marine species on this list is:
CLECOM-PROJECT: Checklist of species-group taxa of continental Mollusca living in the Netherlands (CLECOM Section I) 14-07-2002 with changes.

Gastropoda

Neritidae
 (rozdepka rzeczna) Theodoxus fluviatilis fluviatilis (Linnaeus, 1758)
 Theodoxus fluviatilis littoralis (Linnaeus, 1758)

Aciculidae
 (igliczek karpacki) Acicula parcelineata (Clessin, 1911)
 (igliczek lśniący) Platyla polita (Hartmann, 1840)

Viviparidae
 (żyworódka pospolita) Viviparus viviparus (Linnaeus, 1758)
 (żyworódka rzeczna) Viviparus contectus (Millet, 1813)

Bithyniidae
 (zagrzebka pospolita) Bithynia tentaculata (Linnaeus, 1758)
 (zagrzebka sklepiona) Bithynia leachii (Sheppard, 1823)
 Bithynia transsilvanica (E. A. Bielz, 1853)

Hydrobiidae
 (wodożytka nowozelandzka) Potamopyrgus antipodarum (Gray, 1843) - non-indigenous
 (wodożytka bałtycka) Hydrobia ventrosa (Montagu, 1803)
 (wodożytka przybrzeżna) Peringia ulvae (Pennant, 1777)
 Obrovia neglecta (Muus, 1963)
 (niepozorka ojcowska) Falniowskia neglectissima (Falniowski & Steffek, 1989)
 (namułek pospolity) Lithoglyphus naticoides (C. Pfeiffer, 1828)

Amnicolidae
 (sadzawczak drobny) Marstoniopsis scholtzi (A. Schmidt, 1856)
 (źródlarka karpacka) Bythinella austriaca austriaca (Frauenfeld, 1857)
 Bythinella austriaca ehrmanni Pax, 1938
 Bythinella hungarica Hazay, 1880
 Bythinella zyvionteki Falniowski, 1987
 Bythinella metarubra Falniowski, 1987
 Bythinella micherdzinskii Falniowski, 1980

Valvatidae
 (zawójka płaska) Valvata cristata O. F. Müller, 1774
 (zawójka pospolita) Valvata piscinalis O. F. Müller, 1774
 (zawójka przypłaszczona) Valvata macrostoma Mörch, 1864
 (zawójka rzeczna) Borysthenia naticina (Menke, 1845)

Acroloxidae
 (przyczepka jeziorna) Acroloxus lacustris (Linnaeus, 1758)

Lymnaeidae
 (błotniarka moczarowa) Galba truncatula (O. F. Müller, 1774)
 (błotniarka pospolita) Stagnicola palustris (O. F. Müller, 1774)
 Stagnicola turricula (Held, 1836)
 Stagnicola occultus (Jackiewicz, 1959)
 Stagnicola corvus (Gmelin, 1791)
 (błotniarka uszata) Radix auricularia (Linnaeus, 1758)
 (błotniarka jajowata) Radix peregra auct. (= Radix labiata (Rossmässler, 1835) & Radix balthica (Linnaeus, 1758))
 Radix ampla (W. Hartmann, 1821)
 (błotniarka otułka) Myxas glutinosa (O. F. Müller, 1774)
 (błotniarka stawowa) Lymnaea stagnalis (Linnaeus, 1758)

Physidae
 (rozdętka pospolita) Physa fontinalis (Linnaeus, 1758)
 (rozdętka zaostrzona) Physella acuta (Draparnaud, 1805) - synonym Physella heterostropha (Say, 1817) - non-indigenous
 (zawijka pospolita) Aplexa hypnorum (Linnaeus, 1758)

Planorbidae
 (zatoczek rogowy) Planorbarius corneus (Linnaeus, 1758)
 Planorbella duryi (Wetherby, 1879)
 Menetus dilatatus (Gould, 1841) - non-indigenous
 Ferrissia fragilis (Tryon, 1863) - syn. Ferrissia clessiniana (Jickeli, 1882) - non-indigenous
 (zatoczek obrzeżony) Planorbis carinatus O. F. Müller, 1774
 (zatoczek pospolity) Planorbis planorbis (Linnaeus, 1758)
 (zatoczek moczarowy) Anisus spirorbis (Linnaeus, 1758)
 Anisus septemgyratus (Rossmässler, 1835)
 (zatoczek wieloskrętny) Anisus calculiformis (Sandberger, 1874)
 (zatoczek ostrokrawędzisty) Anisus vortex (Linnaeus, 1758)
 (zatoczek łamliwy) Anisus vorticulus (Troschel, 1834)
 (zatoczek skręcony) Bathyomphalus contortus (Linnaeus, 1758)
 (zatoczek białawy) Gyraulus albus (O. F. Müller, 1774)
 Gyraulus acronicus (A. Férussac, 1807)
 (zatoczek gładki) Gyraulus laevis (Alder, 1838)
 (zatoczek przybrzeżny) Gyraulus riparius (Westerlund, 1865)
 (zatoczek Rossmaesslera) Gyraulus rossmaessleri (Auerswald, 1852)
 (zatoczek malutki) Gyraulus crista (Linnaeus, 1758)
 (zatoczek spłaszczony) Hippeutis complanatus (Linnaeus, 1758)
 (zatoczek lśniący) Segmentina nitida (O. F. Müller, 1774)
 (przytulik strumieniowy) Ancylus fluviatilis O. F. Müller, 1774

Ellobiidae
 Carychium minimum O. F. Müller, 1774 
 Carychium tridentatum (Risso, 1826)

Succineidae
 (bursztynka pospolita) Succinea putris (Linnaeus, 1758)
 (bursztynka podłużna) Succinella oblonga (Draparnaud, 1801)
 (bursztynka wysmukła) Oxyloma elegans (Risso, 1826)
 Oxyloma dunkeri (L. Pfeiffer, 1865)
 Oxyloma sarsii (Esmark, 1886)

Cochlicopidae
 (błyszczotka połyskliwa) Cochlicopa lubrica (O. F. Müller, 1774) - Cochlicopa repentina Hudec, 1960 is a form of Cochlicopa lubrica.
 (błyszczotka mała) Cochlicopa lubricella (Rossmässler, 1835)
 Cochlicopa nitens (M. von Gallenstein, 1848)

Orculidae
 Orcula dolium dolium (Draparnaud, 1801)
 Sphyradium doliolum (Bruguière, 1792)
 Pagodulina pagodula Pagodulina pagodula altilis Klemm, 1939

Argnidae
 Argna bielzi bielzi (Rossmässler, 1859)

Valloniidae
 (ślimaczek żeberkowany) Vallonia costata (O. F. Müller, 1774)
 (ślimaczek gładki) Vallonia pulchella (O. F. Müller, 1774)
 Vallonia excentrica Sterki, 1893
 Vallonia enniensis (Gredler, 1856)
 Vallonia declivis Sterki1893
 (jeżynka kolczasta) Acanthinula aculeata (O. F. Müller, 1774)
 Spermodea lamellata Jeffreys, 1830

Pupillidae
 (poczwarówka pospolita)  Pupilla muscorum (Linnaeus, 1758)
 Pupilla pratensis (Clessin, 1871)
 Pupilla triplicata (S. Studer, 1820)
 Pupilla sterrii (Voith, 1840)

Pyramidulidae
 Pyramidula pusilla (Vallot, 1801)

Chondrinidae
 Granaria frumentum (Draparnaud, 1801)
 (poczwarówka zaostrzona) Chondrina arcadica clienta (Westerlund, 1883)

Vertiginidae
 (poczwarówka bezzębna) Columella edentula (Draparnaud, 1805)
 Columella aspera Walden, 1966
 Columella columella (Martens, 1830)
 Truncatellina costulata (Nilsson, 1822)
 Truncatellina claustralis (Gredler, 1856)
 Truncatellina cylindrica (Férussac, 1807)
 (poczwarówka drobna) Vertigo pusilla O. F. Müller, 1774
 Vertigo antivertigo (Draparnaud, 1801)
 (poczwarówka prążkowana) Vertigo substriata (Jeffreys, 1833)
 (poczwarówka karliczka) Vertigo pygmaea (Draparnaud, 1801)
 Vertigo moulinsiana (Dupuy, 1849)
 Vertigo modesta arctica (Wallenberg, 1858)
 Vertigo ronnebyensis (Westerlund, 1871)
 Vertigo genesii (Gredler, 1856)
 Vertigo geyeri Lindholm, 1925
 Vertigo alpestris Alder, 1837
 (poczwarówka zwężona) Vertigo angustior Jeffreys, 1830

Enidae
 Ena montana (Draparnaud, 1801)
 Merdigera obscura (O. F. Müller, 1774)
 (wałówka trójzębna) Chondrula tridens (O. F. Müller, 1774)

Clausiliidae
 (świdrzyk lśniący) Cochlodina laminata laminata (Montagu, 1803)
 Cochlodina dubiosa corcontica Brabenec, 1967
 Cochlodina costata silesiaca(A. Schmidt, 1868)
 Cochlodina orthostoma orthostoma (Menke, 1828)
 Charpentieria ornata (Rossmässler, 1836)
 Ruthenica filograna filograna (Rossmässler, 1836)
 (świdrzyk okazały) Macrogastra ventricosa (Draparnaud, 1801)
 (świdrzyk rozdęty) Macrogastra tumida (Rossmässler, 1836)
 Macrogastra borealis borealis (O. Boettger, 1878)
 Macrogastra badia crispulata (Westerlund, 1884)
 (świdrzyk leśny) Macrogastra plicatula plicatula (Draparnaud, 1801)
 Macrogastra plicatula inuncta (L. Pfeiffer, 1849)
 Macrogastra plicatula cruda (Rossmässler, 1835)
 Macrogastra plicatula nana (Scholtz, 1843)
 Clausilia rugosa parvula (A. Férussac, 1807)
 Clausilia bidentata bidentata (Ström, 1765)
 Clausilia cruciata cruciata (S. Studer, 1820)
 Clausilia pumila pumila C. Pfeiffer, 1828
 Clausilia dubia dubia Draparnaud, 1805
 (świdrzyk fałdzisty) Laciniaria plicata (Draparnaud, 1801)
 Balea perversa (Linnaeus, 1758)
 (świdrzyk dwufałdkowy) Balea biplicata biplicata (Montagu, 1803)
 Balea fallax (Rossmässler, 1836)
 Balea stabilis (L. Pfeiffer, 1847)
 Vestia elata (Rossmässler, 1836)
 Vestia gulo (E. A. Bielz, 1859)
 Vestia turgida (Rossmässler, 1836)
 (świdrzyk siwy) Bulgarica cana cana (Held, 1836)

Ferussaciidae
 Cecilioides acicula (O. F. Müller, 1774)

Punctidae
 (krążałek malutki) Punctum pygmaeum (Draparnaud, 1801)

Helicodiscidae
 Lucilla singleyana (Pilsbry, 1889)

Discidae
 (krążałek obły) Discus ruderatus (W. Hartmann, 1821)
 (krążałek plamisty) Discus rotundatus (O. F. Müller, 1774)
 Discus perspectivus (Megerle von Mühlfeld, 1816)

Pristilomatidae
 Vitrea diaphana diaphana (S. Studer, 1820)
 Vitrea transsylvanica (Clessin, 1877)
 Vitrea subrimata (Reinhardt, 1871)
 Vitrea crystallina (O. F. Müller, 1774)
 Vitrea contracta (Westerlund, 1871)

Euconulidae
 (stożeczek drobny) Euconulus fulvus (O. F. Müller, 1774)
 Euconulus praticola (Reinhardt, 1883)

Gastrodontidae
 (szklarka obłystek) Zonitoides nitidus (O. F. Müller, 1774)

Oxychilidae
 Daudebardia rufa rufa (Draparnaud, 1805)
 Daudebardia brevipes brevipes (Draparnaud, 1805)
 Carpathica calophana (Westerlund, 1881)
 (szklarka błyszcząca) Oxychilus cellarius (O. F. Müller, 1774)
 Oxychilus draparnaudi draparnaudi (H. Beck, 1837)
 (szklarka czosnkowa) Oxychilus alliarius (Miller, 1822)
 Oxychilus translucidus (Mortillet, 1853)
 Cellariopsis deubeli (A.J. Wagner, 1914)
 Morlina glabra striaria (Westerlund, 1881)
 Mediterranea inopinata (Uličný, 1887)
 Mediterranea depressa (Sterki, 1880)
 Aegopinella pura (Alder, 1830)
 Aegopinella minor (Stabile, 1864)
 Aegopinella nitens (Michaud, 1831)
 Aegopinella nitidula (Draparnaud, 1805)
 Aegopinella epipedostoma iuncta Hudec, 1964
 (szklarka żeberkowana) Perpolita hammonis (Ström, 1765)
 Perpolita petronella (L. Pfeiffer, 1853)

Milacidae
 Tandonia rustica (Millet, 1843)
 Tandonia budapestensis (Hazay, 1880)

Vitrinidae
 Semilimax semilimax (J. Férussac, 1802)
 Semilimax kotulae (Westerlund, 1883)
 Eucobresia diaphana (Draparnaud, 1805)
 Eucobresia nivalis (Dumont & Mortillet, 1854)
 (przeźrotka szklista) Vitrina pellucida (O. F. Müller, 1774)

Boettgerillidae
 Boettgerilla pallens Simroth, 1912

Limacidae
 Limax maximus Linnaeus, 1758
 Limax cinereoniger Wolf, 1803
 Limax bielzii Seibert, 1874
 Limacus flavus (Linnaeus, 1758)
 Malacolimax tenellus (O. F. Müller, 1774)
 Lehmannia marginata (O. F. Müller, 1774)
 Lehmannia macroflagellata Grossu & Lupu, 1962
 Lehmannia valentiana (A. Férussac, 1822)
 Lehmannia carpatica (Bourguignat, 1861)
 (pomrów błękitny)  Bielzia coerulans (M. Bielz, 1851)

Agriolimacidae
 Deroceras agreste (Linnaeus, 1758)
 Deroceras laeve (O. F. Müller, 1774)
 Deroceras moldavicum (Grossu & Lupu, 1961)
 Deroceras praecox Wiktor, 1966
 Deroceras reticulatum (O. F. Müller, 1774)
 Deroceras rodnae Grossu & Lupu, 1965
 Deroceras sturanyi (Simroth, 1894)
 Deroceras turcicum (Simroth, 1894)

Arionidae
 (ślinik wielki) Arion rufus (Linnaeus, 1758)
 Arion lusitanicus J. Mabille, 1868
 Arion fuscus (O. F. Müller, 1774)
 Arion circumscriptus Johnston, 1828
 Arion fasciatus (Nilsson, 1823)
 Arion silvaticus Lohmander, 1937
 Arion distinctus J. Mabille, 1868
 Arion intermedius Normand, 1852

Bradybaenidae
 (zaroślarka pospolita) Fruticicola fruticum (O. F. Müller, 1774)

Helicodontidae
 (ślimak obrzeżony) Helicodonta obvoluta (O. F. Müller, 1774)

Hygromiidae
 (ślimak pagórkowy) Euomphalia strigella (Draparnaud, 1801)
 Monacha cartusiana (O. F. Müller, 1774)
 (ślimak kosmaty) Trichia hispida (Linnaeus, 1758)
 Trichia sericea (Draparnaud, 1801)
 Trichia villosula (Rossmässler, 1838)
 Trichia lubomirskii (Ślósarskii, 1881)
 Petasina unidentata unidentata (Draparnaud, 1805)
 Petasina bakowskii (Polinski, 1924)
 Petasina bielzi bielzi (E. A. Bielz, 1859)
 Petasina bielzi euconus (Westerlund, 1890)
 Helicopsis striata striata (O. F. Müller, 1774)
 Helicella itala itala (Linnaeus, 1758)
 Candidula unifasciata unifasciata (Poiret, 1801)
 Cernuella neglecta (Draparnaud, 1805)
 (ślimak łąkowy) Pseudotrichia rubiginosa (Rossmässler, 1838)
 Monachoides incarnatus incarnatus (O. F. Müller, 1774)
 (ślimak karpacki) Monachoides vicinus (Rossmässler, 1842)
 (ślimak dwuzębny) Perforatella bidentata (Gmelin, 1791)
 Perforatella dibothrion (M. von Kimakowicz, 1884)
 Urticicola umbrosus (C. Pfeiffer, 1828)
 (ślimak przydrożny) Xerolenta obvia obvia (Menke, 1828)

Helicidae
 (ślimak zaroślowy) Arianta arbustorum arbustorum (Linnaeus, 1758)
 (ślimak ostrokrawędzisty) Helicigona lapicida lapicida (Linnaeus, 1758)
 Faustina faustina faustina (Rossmässler, 1835)
 Faustina rossmaessleri (L. Pfeiffer, 1842)
 Faustina cingulella (Rossmässler, 1837)
 (ślimak maskowiec) Isognomostoma isognomostomos (Schröter, 1784)
 Causa holosericea (S. Studer, 1820)
 (wstężyk ogrodowy) Cepaea hortensis (O. F. Müller, 1774)
 (wstężyk gajowy) Cepaea nemoralis (Linnaeus, 1758)
 (wstężyk austriacki) Cepaea vindobonensis (C. Pfeiffer, 1828)
 Cornu aspersum aspersum (O. F. Müller, 1774)
 (ślimak żółtawy) Helix lutescens (Rossmässler, 1837)
 (ślimak winniczek) Helix pomatia Linnaeus, 1758

Bivalvia
Margaritiferidae
 (perłoródka rzeczna) Margaritifera margaritifera margaritifera (Linnaeus, 1758) - extinct

Unionidae
 (skójka malarska) Unio pictorum pictorum (Linnaeus, 1758)
 (skójka zaostrzona) Unio tumidus tumidus Philipsson, 1788
 (skójka gruboskorupowa) Unio crassus crassus Philipsson, 1788
 (szczeżuja pospolita) Anodonta anatina radiata (O. F. Müller, 1774)
 (szczeżuja wielka) Anodonta cygnea cygnea (Linnaeus, 1758)
 (szczeżuja spłaszczona) Pseudanodonta complanata klettii (Rossmässler, 1835)
 Sinanodonta woodiana (Lea, 1834) - non-indigenous

Sphaeriidae
 (gałeczka rogowa) Sphaerium corneum (Linnaeus, 1758)
 Sphaerium nucleus (S. Studer, 1820)
 Sphaerium ovale (A. Férussac, 1807)
 (gałeczka rzeczna) Sphaerium rivicola (Lamarck, 1818)
 Sphaerium solidum (Normand, 1844)
 (kruszynka delikatna) Musculium lacustre (O. F. Müller, 1774)
 (groszkówka rzeczna) Pisidium amnicum (O. F. Müller, 1774)
 (groszkówka pospolita) Pisidium casertanum (Poli, 1791)
 Pisidium personatum Malm, 1855
 Pisidium obtusale (Lamarck, 1818)
 (groszkówka jajowata) Pisidium henslowanum (Sheppard, 1823)
 Pisidium supinum A. Schmidt, 1851
 Pisidium lilljeborgii Clessin, 1886
 Pisidium hibernicum Westerlund, 1894
 (groszkówka lśniąca) Pisidium nitidum Jenyns, 1832
 Pisidium pseudosphaerium J. Favre, 1927
 Pisidium milium Held, 1836
 Pisidium subtruncatum Malm, 1855
 Pisidium pulchellum Jenyns, 1832
 Pisidium conventus Clessin, 1877
 Pisidium moitessierianum Paladilhe, 1866

Dreissenidae
 (racicznica zmienna) Dreissena polymorpha polymorpha (Pallas, 1771)

See also
Lists of molluscs of surrounding countries:
 List of non-marine molluscs of Germany
 List of non-marine molluscs of the Czech Republic
 List of non-marine molluscs of Slovakia
 List of non-marine molluscs of Ukraine
 List of non-marine molluscs of Belarus
 List of non-marine molluscs of Lithuania
 List of non-marine molluscs of Kaliningrad Oblast

References

Lists of biota of Poland
Poland
Poland
Poland